The 1975 European Karate Championships, the 10th edition, was held  in Ostend, Belgium from May 5 to 7, 1975.

Competition

Team

References

1975
International sports competitions hosted by Belgium
European Karate Championships
European championships in 1975
Sport in Ostend
Karate competitions in Belgium